The Gymnasium Hankensbüttel is a Gymnasium in Hankensbüttel, Lower Saxony and the oldest one in the district of Gifhorn.

History 

The Gymnasium Hankensbüttel was first established in 1947 as a private high school. In May 1951 it was given the right to hold mittlere Reife examinations. In the years 1953/54 the classes 12 and 13 were lectured for the first time. In 1954 the private school was acknowledged as a public school. The word Gymnasium has been used by the school since 1956. A trip was made to Wurmberg (Harz) to celebrate the school's 50th jubilee in 1997.

Gymnasium Hankensbüttel is a campus school with multiple buildings spread across its green campus. After the abolishment of the middle school grades 5 and 6 as a separate school, the campus has been expanded further allowing newer building to merge with the old. A modern cafeteria and aula was built and joins 'Fachwerk' buildings giving the school a specific charm. In 2021, approximately 1,000 students were enrolled and circa 85 teachers on staff.

Success in sports 

 1987: German championship of the chess team (7th and 8th grade) in Altensteig
 1989: German championship of the girls' handball team in the 3rd competitions class in (Berlin)
 2003: Lower Saxony championship of the quad scull mixed rowing team in (Hannover)
 2004: Lower Saxony championship of the quad scull rowing team in (Hannover)
 2004: Lower Saxony championship of the girls' tennis team in (Melle)
 2006: German championship of the quad scull rowing team in Berlin 
 2008: Lower Saxony championship of the girls' tennis team in Helmstedt

Headmasters 
 Willy Ernst (1947–1968)
 Dietrich Korn (1968–1997)
 Ulf Bartkowiak (1997–2010)
 Martin Hille (2010-2011)
 Cornelia Röhrkasten (since 2011)

Well known pupils 

 Hans Pleschinski (born 1956), author
 Astrid Frohloff (born 1962),  journalist and television presenter
 Bernd Fix (born 1962), computer security expert
 Oliver Graf (born 1981), actor and cultural manager

Twinning schools 

  Senior High School, Clintonville, Wisconsin, United States
 Collège „Philippe de Champaigne“, Le Mesnil-Saint-Denis, France
 Kaltinėnai Aleksandras Stulginskis Gymnasium, Lithuania

External links 
 Official website

References 

Gymnasiums in Germany
Gifhorn (district)
Schools in Lower Saxony
Educational institutions established in 1947
1947 establishments in Germany